Yarkon (or Yarqon) is a river in Israel, whose name gave birth to several other terms. It may refer to:

 Yarkon River, an Israeli river which originates at Tel Afek, north of Petah Tikva
 Yarqon bleak, a species of ray-finned fish in the family Cyprinidae, found only in Israel
 Yarkon Cemetery, the main cemetery for the Tel Aviv Metropolitan Area since 1991 located within the Petah Tikva city limits
 Yarkon Park, a large urban park in Tel Aviv, Israel
 Yarkon Sports Complex, a sports complex located in the Baptist Village in Petah Tikva
 HaYarkon Street, a major street in Tel Aviv
 Yarkona, a moshav in central Israel, named after the river